Hanford School is a girls' boarding preparatory school located in Hanford, Child Okeford, Dorset, England, established in 1947 and located in a grade II* listed house built in 1604 by Sir Robert Seymer.

History
Hanford House was built in Jacobean style in 1604, or 1620, and completed in 1623, by Sir Robert Seymer, who was a teller of the Exchequer and who was knighted in 1619, and whose family had lived in Hanford for several centuries, and the small Gothic chapel was built in 1650. Country Life magazine wrote in 1905 that "the chapel is a picturesque building with a high gable, pleasant to look at, and within are several memorials of the Seymers."

In 1947, the house and grounds were bought by the Reverend and Mrs. Clifford Canning and converted to a school. Clifford Canning had been headmaster of Canford School. In 1959, the school was taken over by their daughter, Sarah. In 1960, the building was listed as grade II*, ten days after the nearby Church of St Michael and All Angels. After retiring as headmistress in 2003, she handed the school over to the Hanford School Charitable Trust in 2004, which now runs it.

Boarding pupils are split into two houses – Fan’s for year 8 pupils and Main House for all other years.

Headmasters and Mistresses 

 The Reverend Clifford and Enid Canning (1947 - 1959)
 Sarah Canning (1959 - 2003)
 Michael and Ann Sharp (1980s - 2003)
 Robert and Kate Mackenzie Johnston (1994 - 2003)
 Nigel and Sarah Mackay (2003 - 2014)
 Rory and George Johnston (2014 - present)

Notable staff
Sarah Butt, captain of the England lacrosse national team

Notable alumni

 Amanda Foreman
 Millie Mackintosh Made in Chelsea
 Santa Montefiore
 Kate Rock, Baroness Rock
 Tara Palmer-Tomkinson
 Dame Emma Kirkby

References

External links
Hanford School at the Independent Schools Council
Hanford School at the Independent Schools Inspectorate
Hanford School, Dorset at ISBI

Educational institutions established in 1947
Girls' schools in Dorset
Boarding schools in Dorset
Preparatory schools in Dorset
North Dorset District
Grade II* listed buildings in Dorset
1947 establishments in England
Houses completed in 1623